The town of Stafford, Staffordshire, England gained its mayoral charter from King James I. The first mayor was Matthew Cradock, jnr in 1614.

The following have been mayors of Stafford:

Source:  Stafford Borough Council unless otherwise stated

1614–15 Matthew Cradock, First Mayor of Stafford, MP for Stafford 5 times between 1621 and 1628 
1622 Thomas Worswick 
1706 William Abnett
1708 Abraham Hoskins
1716 Abraham Hoskins
1719 William Robins
1720 William Abnett
1731 William Robins
1740 William Robins

19th century 
Source: Stafford Borough Council

 1836  John Masfen Jn. Kenderdine Shaw
 1837  William Jones
 1838  Charles Dudley
 1839  Thomas Stevenson
 1840  Edward Lloyd
 1841  John Rogers
 1842  Charles Chester Mort
 1843  Thomas Boulton
 1844  John Griffin
 1845  Charles Ed Morgan
 1846  James Webb
 1847  John Marson
 1848  James Turnock
 1849  Thomas Benson Elley
 1850  Thomas Benson Elley
 1851  William Jones, Jun.
 1852  Thomas Turner
 1853  Thomas Boulton
 1854  John Henson Webb
 1855  John Griffin
 1856  John Griffin
 1857  John Griffin
 1858  Henry Thos Lomax
 1859  John Lea
 1860  William Buxton
 1861  William Buxton
 1862  John Brewster
 1863  Jonas Pilling
 1864  Edward Mousley
 1865  Edward Mousley
 1866  John Morgan
 1867  William Silvester
 1868  Richard Podmore
 1869  Ephraim Austin
 1870  Henry Gillard
 1871  Hugh Woods Gibson
 1872  Bateman P Wright
 1873  John Kelsall
 1874  John Shallcross
 1875  John Shallcross
 1876  Jas C Marson (deceased)
 1876  H W Gibson (successor)
 1877  John Averill 
 1878  Frederic Marson
 1879  William Wright
 1880  John Tasker Evans
 1881  Chas Henry Dudley
 1882  Chas Henry Dudley
 1883  Zachariah Anderson
 1884  Frederic Greatrex
 1885  Nicholas Joyce
 1886  Wm Henry Peach
 1887  Alfred Ward
 1888  Cornelius Mycock
 1889  Thomas Amies
 1890  William Peach
 1891  William Lloyd
 1892  William Silvester
 1893  George Wormal
 1894  Charles Henry Wright
 1895  Wm Hy Turkington
 1896  Frederick Greatrex
 1897  Walter Charles Towers Mynors
 1898  Walter Charles Towers Mynors
 1899  Walter Charles Towers Mynors

20th century

21st century

References

Stafford

Politics of Staffordshire
Mayors of Stafford
Stafford